The Tournoi des 4 (Four Nations Tournament) was a football tournament that took place in Fort-de-France, Martinique during June 2018.

The competition was announced in January 2018 and featured the Corsica national football team's first matches outside of Europe.

Participants

Matches

Semi-finals

Third place play-off

Final

References 

2018 in association football
Tournoi
International association football competitions hosted by Martinique